The Broadcasting Complaints Commission in the United Kingdom existed from 1 June 1981 to 1 April 1997. Along with the Broadcasting Standards Council (established 16 May 1988) it was then replaced by the Broadcasting Standards Commission. This was itself abolished and replaced by Ofcom on 29 December 2003.

Its chair from 1987 to 1991 was Shirley Paget, Marchioness of Anglesey.

References

Communications authorities
Communications in the United Kingdom
Mass media complaints authorities
Consumer organisations in the United Kingdom
1981 establishments in the United Kingdom
2003 disestablishments in the United Kingdom
Government agencies established in 1981
Government agencies disestablished in 2003